The Scarlet Blade (released in the United States as The Crimson Blade) is a 1963 British adventure film directed by John Gilling and starring Lionel Jeffries, Oliver Reed, Jack Hedley and June Thorburn.

It is a period drama set during the English Civil War.

Plot
When King Charles I is captured by Roundhead forces led by the tyrant Colonel Judd and his right-hand man Captain Sylvester, it is up to a band of locals loyal to the King led by a Robin Hood–type character named the Scarlet Blade to try to rescue him. They are helped by Judd's daughter Claire who secretly helps them in defiance of her father.

Cast
 Lionel Jeffries as Colonel Judd  
 Oliver Reed as Captain Tom Sylvester  
 Jack Hedley as Edward Beverley, the Scarlet Blade  
 June Thorburn as Claire Judd
 Michael Ripper as Pablo
 Harold Goldblatt as Jacob  
 Duncan Lamont as Major Bell  
 Clifford Elkin as Philip Beverley  
 Suzan Farmer as Constance Beverley  
 John Harvey as Sgt. Grey  
 Charles Houston as Drury
 Robert Rietti as King Charles I
 George Woodbridge as Towncryer

External links

1963 films
1960s historical adventure films
British historical adventure films
Films shot at Associated British Studios
English Civil War films
Films directed by John Gilling
Hammer Film Productions films
Columbia Pictures films
British swashbuckler films
Cultural depictions of Charles I of England
1960s English-language films
1960s British films